Direct Fly was a regional airline based in Warsaw, Poland. It operated domestic services. Its main base was Warsaw Frederic Chopin Airport.

History
The airline started operations on 12 April 2006.

In May 2008 the company gave birth to a new airline called SprintAir that flies night airmail and small parcels using 2 of its former aircraft converted into cargo and adding another one of the same type to its fleet.

Destinations

As of March 2007, Direct Fly operated scheduled domestic flights to the following destinations:
Warsaw
Gdańsk
Wrocław
Kraków

Initially, the airline had been flying to Łódź, Bydgoszcz, Berlin-Schönefeld, Copenhagen, Kyiv and Lwów. After two months of operation, it eliminated all of its international routes and more than half of the domestic ones.

Fleet

The Direct Fly fleet included the following aircraft:

2 Saab 340A

External links 
Direct Fly

References

Defunct airlines of Poland
Airlines established in 2005
Airlines disestablished in 2007